Septulina is a genus of flowering plants belonging to the family Loranthaceae.

Its native range is Southern Namibia to South African Republic.

Species
Species:

Septulina glauca 
Septulina ovalis

References

Loranthaceae
Loranthaceae genera